The 2010 Nanjing chemical plant explosion occurred on July 28, 2010 in Qixia District, Nanjing, Jiangsu province, People's Republic of China.

Explosion
The explosion happened at 10:15 am in the abandoned Nanjing No.4 Plastics factory. Most buildings within a 100-metre radius were flattened by the blast, according to China National Radio. According to official news, at least 13 people were killed with as many as 300 people injured. However, eyewitness accounts suggested the total number of deaths was much higher.

Aftermath
A preliminary investigation suggested that the explosion was caused by the rupture of a propylene pipeline.

References

Explosions in 2010
Nanjing Chemical Plant Explosion, 2010
Chemical plant explosions
Explosions in China
Nanjing Chemical Plant Explosion, 2010
July 2010 events in China